Nerman Fatić (born 24 October 1994) is a Bosnian professional tennis player. He is a member of the Bosnia and Herzegovina Davis Cup team. He has a career-high ATP singles ranking of No. 196 achieved on 26 September 2022 after winning his Maiden Challenger in Sibiu, Romania.

ATP Challenger and ITF Futures/World Tennis Tour Finals

Singles: 14 (7-7)

Doubles titles (7)

External links

References

1994 births
Living people
Bosnia and Herzegovina male tennis players
Sportspeople from Sarajevo